Janet Feder is a Denver, Colorado–based composer and guitarist. She is a classically trained guitar player best known for her work in the prepared guitar genre. In addition, Janet Feder is: a lecturer at the University of Colorado; co-curator of MediaLive, an annual festival in Boulder, Colorado; and an Artistic Associate of Square Product Theatre.

Biography
Solo projects include T H I S C L O S E (2015), Songs with Words (2012), Ironic Universe, a CD & DVD featuring Fred Frith (AdHoc Records/USA 2006), and Speak Puppet (Recommended Records/UK 2001), as well as compilations for Zerx Records (Albuquerque, NM; 1999-07) and the compilation The $100 Guitar Project (Bridge Records, 2012). She also appears on Jane Rigler's Rarefactions (Neuma 2015) and Honey Barbara's Wave Grass (2015), in addition to 156 Strings produced by Henry Kaiser for Cuneiform Records (USA, 2002) and I Never Meta Guitar produced by Elliott Sharp for Clean Feed Records (Portugal, 2010), both featuring guitar players from around the globe.

In conjunction with Paul Fowler, Feder composed the film score Leavings (2014), plus the score and sound design for the Square Product Theatre adaptation of Selah Saterstrom's novel SLAB.

Feder was one of several contributors to Paul Riola's Bottesini Project, where her work was featured alongside Nels Cline, Keenan Wayne, CacheFlowe, Glenn Taylor, and Mark Harris on the 2009 album Naima's Grass Pajamas. The album began as "collective improvisations recorded live in the studio" which "were then later reconstructed."

T H I S C L O S E (2015) and Songs With Words (2012) were both recorded live at Immersive Studios in Boulder, Colorado in DSD Pure on Gus Skinas' 32 channel Sonoma System and are currently available on both vinyl and SACD. There are no digital effects on either Songs With Words or T H I S C L O S E. A reviewer noted that Songs With Words  "explores the outer reaches of sonic possibility yet never loses the thread of melody and beauty." while T H I S C L O S E has been described as "Feder's most fully realised album...Unique and highly moving music"

Previously the Chair of the Music Department at Naropa University in Boulder, Colorado, Feder has performed or collaborated with Fred Frith, Nels Cline, Henry Kaiser, Bill Frisell, Elliott Sharp, Mike Keneally, Bryan Beller, Amy Denio, Chris Cutler, Mike Johnson/Thinking Plague, Susie Asado, Nikmat Hatraktor, Paolo Angeli, Wu Fei, Thomas Dimuzzio, Tatsuya Nakatani, Erin McKeown, Jane Rigler, Shoko Nagai, Satoshi Takeishi, James Sidlo, Pauline Oliveros and poet Anne Waldman.

Feder's solo work was featured in a June 2012 Tiny Desk Concert on NPR. Feder is also currently half of Denver-based duo Cowhause with Colin Bricker.

Discography
Solo:
icyimi (1994)
Speak Puppet (2000)
Songs With Words (2012)
T H I S C L O S E (2015)

With Paul Flowler:
Leavings (2014)

With Fred Frith:
Ironic Universe (2006)

With Various Artists
I Never Meta Guitar (2010)
$100 Guitar Project (2013)

References

Year of birth missing (living people)
Living people
American women guitarists
Guitarists from Colorado
People from Denver
21st-century American women